Jose Lorenzo Briones (February 10, 1916 – unknown) was a Filipino Visayan politician and lawyer. He served as Governor of the Province of Cebu (1955–1961) and member of the House of Representatives for the 2nd District of Cebu (1961–1969).

Early life 
Jose Briones was the son of Manuel C. Briones and Celestina Lorenzo. He attended Zapatera Elementary School and graduated top of his class, and he studied at the Cebu Provincial High School. He finished law at the Ateneo de Manila and became a lawyer on March 13, 1946. He was married to Luna Cabrera.

Career 
His career started as his father's private secretary. In 1947, during the first post-war elections, he was elected member of the Cebu City Council together with Eulogio Borres, and Carlos Cuizon, and he served until 1951. On November 8, 1955, he was elected Governor of Cebu and formally assumed the role on December 30, 1955, succeeding Sergio V. Osmeña Jr. He was reelected and won over Ramon Durano on November 10, 1959.

Briones was later elected to represent Cebu's 2nd District in the House of Representatives of the Philippines. He served from December 30, 1961 to December 30, 1969 before retiring  that same year.

Historical commemoration 

 The Jose L. Briones Street is named in his honor by virtue of City Ordinance No. 1825 approved by on April 13, 2000.

References 

1916 births
Members of the House of Representatives of the Philippines from Cebu
Members of the Philippine Legislature
Governors of Cebu
20th-century Filipino lawyers
Ateneo de Manila University alumni
Year of death missing